Timothy F. Larkin (died November 4, 1960) was an American football player and coach. He served as the head football coach at the College of the Holy Cross in Worcester, Massachusetts from 1907 to 1912. Larkin played college football as a quarterback at Holy Cross from 1903 to 1905.

Head coaching record

College

References

Year of birth missing
1960 deaths
American football quarterbacks
Holy Cross Crusaders football coaches
Holy Cross Crusaders football players
High school football coaches in Massachusetts